is a Japanese actress.

Biography
Koike starred in Kunitoshi Manda's film The Kiss. She appeared in Kiyoshi Kurosawa's 2012 television drama Penance,  and co-starred in Junji Sakamoto's A Chorus of Angels with Sayuri Yoshinaga. She also co-starred in Masanori Tominaga's Vengeance Can Wait with Takayuki Yamada.
She was nominated for Best Supporting Actress at Japan Academy Prize for her outstanding performance in the film Rebirth.

Filmography

Film
 Kamikaze Girls (2004)
 2LDK (2004)
 Yaji and Kita: The Midnight Pilgrims (2005)
 The Kiss (2007)
 Paco and the Magical Book (2008)
 20th Century Boys (2009)
 Vengeance Can Wait (2010)
 No Longer Human (2010)
 Rebirth (2011)
 Railways (2011)
 Liar Game: Reborn (2012)
 A Chorus of Angels (2012)
 Unforgiven (2013), Okaji
 April Fools (2015)
 A Living Promise (2016)
 Terraformars (2016)
 To Each His Own (2017)
 Close-Knit (2017), Naomi
 Perfect Revolution (2017)
 Recall (2018)
 Sunny: Our Hearts Beat Together (2018)
 Hit Me Anyone One More Time (2019), Nozomi Banba
 Poupelle of Chimney Town (2020), Rola (voice)
 A Morning of Farewell (2021)
 Jigoku no Hanazono: Office Royale (2021), Reina Onimaru
Struggling Man (2021)

Television
 Bayside Shakedown (1997)
 Ōoku (2005), Oden
 Yoshitsune (2005), Tomoe Gozen
 Penance (2012)
 Legal High (2012–13)
 Zero: Ikkakusenkin Game (2018)
 Ōoku the Final (2019), Gekkō-in
 A Day-Off of Ryoma Takeuchi (2020)
 Our Sister's Soulmate (2020), Hinako Ichihara
 Gourmet Detective Goro Akechi (2021), Maria Magdalene
 The 13 Lords of the Shogun (2022), Hōjō Masako

Dubbing roles

 Mulan, Xian Lang (Gong Li)

References

External links
 
 

Living people
Actresses from Tokyo
Japanese film actresses
Japanese gravure models
Japanese television actresses
Japanese television personalities
Pride Fighting Championships
Mixed martial arts broadcasters
1980 births
20th-century Japanese actresses
21st-century Japanese actresses